Informal or ad hoc romanizations of Cyrillic have been in use since the early days of electronic communications, starting from early e-mail and bulletin board systems. Their use faded with the advances in the Russian internet that made support of Cyrillic script standard, but resurfaced with the proliferation of instant messaging, SMS and mobile phone messaging in Russia.

Development
Due to its informal character, there was neither a well-established standard nor a common name. In the early days of e-mail, the humorous term "Volapuk encoding" was sometimes used.

More recently the term "translit" emerged to indiscriminately refer to both programs that transliterate Cyrillic (and other non-Latin alphabets) into Latin, as well as the result of such transliteration.  The word is an abbreviation of the term transliteration, and most probably its usage originated in several places. An example of early "translit" is the DOS program TRANSLIT  by Jan Labanowski, which runs from the command prompt to convert a Cyrillic file to a Latin one using a specified transliteration table.

There are two basic varieties of romanization of Russian: transliterations and Leetspeak-type of rendering of Russian text. The latter one is often heavily saturated with common English words, which are often much shorter than the corresponding Russian ones, and is sometimes referred to as Runglish or Russlish.

Translit
Translit is a method of encoding Cyrillic letters with Latin ones. The term is derived from transliteration, the system of replacing letters of one alphabet with letters of another. Translit found its way into web forums, chats, messengers, emails, MMORPGs and other network games. Some Cyrillic web sites had a translit version for cases of encoding problems.

As computer and network technologies developed support for the Cyrillic script, translit fell into disrepute. Sometimes translit users were ignored or even banned in Cyrillic-using communities.

Translit received its last development impulse with the increasing availability of mobile phones in Cyrillic-using countries. At first, the situation was the same as with computers; neither mobile phones nor mobile network operators supported Cyrillic. Although mobile phone technology now supports Unicode including all variants of Cyrillic alphabets, a single SMS in Unicode is limited to 70 characters, whereas a Latinate SMS can have up to 160 characters. If a message exceeds the character limit, it is split into multiple parts. That makes messages written in Cyrillic more expensive.

Sometimes ⟨y⟩, ⟨yu⟩, ⟨yo⟩, ⟨ye⟩, ⟨ya⟩ serve as transliteration for ⟨й⟩, ⟨ю⟩, ⟨ё⟩, ⟨е⟩, ⟨я⟩.

Lately a more aggressive form of translit appeared, its identifying characteristic being the use of numbers to substitute some of the letters. For example, 4 reads as "ch" and is used to translit letter "ч", from the transliteration of the word "four" in Russian ("Chetyre", четыре), or, arguably, the appearance of the letter similar to that of four in Arabic numerals. Also, a number can substitute its whole name as part of a word: "sov7" for "sovsem" ("completely") or "posmo3" for "posmotri" ("have a look", imperative).

Such translit is often so distorted that native speakers have trouble reading it. The use of translit is forbidden on many Internet forums.

Russia and other former Soviet republics adopted the ISO 9 transliteration standard for official use (under the designation 7.79-2000), replacing the old Soviet GOST 16876-71.

Translit in Bulgaria
A modified version of Translit, called Shlyokavitsa or Maimunitsa is used widely on the Internet in Bulgaria. It is similar to Russian translit, except for the following differences:

 ⟨ъ⟩ can be transliterated as ⟨a⟩, ⟨u⟩ and ⟨y⟩ and rarely as ⟨1⟩
 ⟨я⟩ is usually transliterated as ⟨q⟩, but ⟨ya⟩, ⟨ja⟩ and ⟨ia⟩ can be seen
 ⟨ч⟩ is transliterated as either ⟨4⟩ or ⟨ch⟩
 ⟨ц⟩ is transliterated as either ⟨ts⟩ or ⟨c⟩
 ⟨ж⟩ is transliterated as ⟨j⟩, sometimes ⟨v⟩
 ⟨ю⟩ is transliterated as either ⟨iu⟩, ⟨yu⟩, ⟨ju⟩ or ⟨u⟩
 ⟨й⟩ is transliterated as either ⟨i⟩, ⟨y⟩ or ⟨j⟩
 ⟨ь⟩ is usually transliterated either the same as ⟨й⟩, or omitted
 ⟨ш⟩ is transliterated as ⟨6⟩ or ⟨sh⟩
 ⟨в⟩ is mostly transliterated as ⟨v⟩, but ⟨w⟩ has been seen due to the placement of the letter on the Bulgarian phonetic traditional keyboard
 ⟨щ⟩ is transliterated as ⟨6t⟩ or ⟨sht⟩
Some of these transliterations come from the placement of the letters on the Bulgarian phonetic traditional keyboard, even if the corresponding latin letter has nothing in common: 

 ⟨я⟩ as ⟨q⟩
 ⟨ъ⟩ as ⟨y⟩
 ⟨ц⟩ as ⟨c⟩
 ⟨ж⟩ as ⟨v⟩

Some people type in Shlyokavitsa entirely like there were on the Bulgarian phonetic traditional keyboard, leading to some symbols being used:

 ⟨ч⟩ as ⟨ ` ⟩
 ⟨ш⟩ as ⟨ [ ⟩
 ⟨щ⟩ as ⟨ ] ⟩
 ⟨ю⟩ as ⟨ \ ⟩

This leads to things like spelling "чушка" (pepper) as ⟨`u[ka⟩.

Volapuk encoding

Volapuk encoding (kodirovka "volapük") or latinitsa (латиница) is a slang term for rendering the letters of the Cyrillic script with Latin ones. Unlike Translit, in which characters are replaced to sound the same, in volapuk characters can be replaced to look or sound the same.

Etymology
The name Volapuk encoding comes from the constructed language Volapük, for two reasons. Cyrillic text written in this way looks strange and often funny, just as a Volapük-language text may appear. At the same time, the word "Volapük" ("Волапюк/Воляпюк" Volapyuk/Volyapyuk in Russian) itself sounds close to the words "воля" (will) and "пук" (fart), funny enough for the name to have stuck.

The term was popularized by its use in the first Soviet commercially available UUCP and TCP/IP network, RELCOM (a typical networking software package included Cyrillic KOI-8 to Volapuk transcoding utilities called tovol and fromvol, originally implemented by Vadim Antonov), making it the likely origin of the usage of Volapuk as applied to Cyrillic encoding.

History
Volapuk and Translit have been in use since the early days of the Internet to write e-mail messages and other texts in Russian where the support of Cyrillic fonts was limited: either the sender did not have a keyboard with Cyrillic letters or the receiver did not necessarily have Cyrillic screen fonts. In the early days, the situation was aggravated by a number of mutually incompatible computer encodings for the Cyrillic script, so that the sender and receiver were not guaranteed to have the same one. Also, the 7-bit character encoding of the early days was an additional hindrance.

Some Russian e-mail providers even included Volapuk encoding in the list of available options for the e-mails routed abroad, e.g.,
"MIME/BASE64, MIME/Quoted-Printable, volapuk, uuencode"

By the late 1990s, the encoding problem had been almost completely resolved, due to increasing support from software manufacturers and Internet service providers. Volapuk still maintains a level of use for SMS text messages, because it is possible to fit more characters in a Latinized SMS message than a Unicode one. It is also used in computer games that do not allow Cyrillic text in chat, particularly Counter-Strike.

Rules
Volapuk often replaces Cyrillic letters with Latin ones in order to look the same or at least similar as typed or handwritten Cyrillic letters.
 Replace "the same" letters: a, e, K, M, T, o. Capitalize when necessary for closer resemblance (к: K better than k, м: M better than m, т: T better than t (which looks exactly like 'm' in handwritten Cyrillic).
 Replace similar-looking letters: в – B, г – r (handwritten resemblance), з – 3 (i.e. number three), л – J| or /\ (the last is again handwritten resemblance), н – Н, п – n (handwritten resemblance), р – p, с – c, у – y, х – x, ч – 4, я – R, и – N. This may vary.
 Replace all other non-obvious hard-to-represent characters using leet (any combination of Latin letters, numbers or punctuation that might bear a passing resemblance to the Cyrillic letter in question); there are many options for each letter. (For example, letter 'щ' can be encoded in more than 15 different ways). Examples: ж – *, щ – LLI_, э – -) and so on. The choice for each letter depends on the preferences of the individual user.

Encoding depends on the language as well. For example, Ukrainian-speaking users have their own traditions, distinct from the Russian ones.

Table

Example
 Советский Союз  (Cyrillic) [Soviet Union]
 CoBeTcKuu' CoIO3 ("volapuk")
 Sovetskiy Soyuz (transliteration)

Russian Chat Alphabet

The Russian Chat Alphabet is a fast-to-type mix of translit and Volapuk, being translit mostly, but giving the option to replace some 2 or 3 character transliterations with shorter 1 character counterparts from Volapuk. This speeds up typing; however, in some cases characters may be Volapuk-encoded, making text appear incorrectly and therefore be harder or impossible to read. In Russia and countries where Russian is used regularly to communicate via mobile phone and chat room, it is used as an alternative and free style of transliteration. It also works around the limitations of programs and/or devices where a Cyrillic keyboard is not available.

Within Russia, one reason to use transliteration for Russian text is that mobile characters allow for more Latin characters than Cyrillic ones per SMS: Latin and capital Greek letters are covered by the GSM seven-bit alphabet, allowing up to 160 such characters in a message, while Cyrillic letters are not, requiring a 16-bit encoding that limits messages to 70 characters. In this case, the focus is of course on getting one Latin character (of which there are 26) for each Cyrillic character (of which there are 33 in Russian, and additional characters in Ukrainian and other languages using Cyrillic script). Only those used for Russian are exemplified here.

Where variants are given, the first is most common and the last is less common, although trends change quickly and differ from person to person. Lack of standardization is the biggest weakness of this informal transliterations, as different styles contradict each other and can make reading slower than necessary.

See also
 Transliteration
 Romanization of Russian
 Arabic chat alphabet
 Romanization of Ukrainian
 Faux Cyrillic – The reverse, e.g. "ЯUSSIAИ"
 Mojibake
 Greeklish

References

Bibliography
Frolov, A.V. and Frolov, G.V. Electronic Mail. Your Internet Companion (А.В. Фролов, Г.В. Фролов, "Электронная почта. Ваш спутник в Интернете") Russkaya Redaktsiya Publishers (Русская Редакция) (2000) , Chapter 6 online

External links
RUS1.NET — 1:1 (univocal) transliteration map for learners of Russian, links to free auto-transliteration and IME tools for Firefox and Chrome.
 Example on-line transliterator (in Russian)

Translit external links
 Kbd.winrus.com Online Service for Cyrillic (Russian and Ukrainian) – Virtual Keyboard "No translit!"
 Outdated Transliterators Known problems of Transliteration Services and modern alternatives
 Translit.biz Non-trivial Russian-English Transliteration (for domain names and URLs).
 Translit Ru/En Online Russian-English Transliteration, supports multiple transliteration standards and spell check.
 Translit.ru Russian-English transliterator and spell checker (in Russian).
 Translit.site online service of transliteration. It supports different Russian-English translit standards.
 Translit.tv Russian-Latin transliterator, spell checker and translator (in Russian).
 Русский ТРАНСЛИТ a transliterator that also works on mobile devices

Russian
Russian language
Russian-language computing